The Independent Spirit Award for Best Supporting Female was an award presented annually by Film Independent. It is given in honor of an actress who has delivered an absolutely outstanding performance in a supporting role while working in an independent film.It was first presented in 1985 with Anjelica Huston being the first recipient of the award for her role as Gretta Conroy in The Dead. It was last presented in 2022 with Ruth Negga being the final recipient of the award for her role in Passing.

In 2022, it was announced that the four acting categories would be retired and replaced with two gender neutral categories, with both Best Supporting Male and Best Supporting Female merging into the Best Supporting Performance category. 

Since its inception, the award has been given to 33 actresses. With 3 nominations, Allison Janney is the most nominated female in this category (finally winning one for her performance in I, Tonya).

Dianne Wiest, Penélope Cruz, Mo'Nique, Lupita Nyong'o, Patricia Arquette, Allison Janney, Regina King and Yuh-jung Youn are the only actresses to have won both this award and the Academy Award for Best Supporting Actress the same year.

Winners and nominees

1980s

1990s

2000s

2010s

2020s

Multiple nominees

3 nominations
 Allison Janney

2 nominations

 Cate Blanchett
 Jessica Chastain
 Patricia Clarkson
 Rosemarie DeWitt
 Melonie Diaz
 Marcia Gay Harden
 Anjelica Huston
 Jennifer Jason Leigh
 Jennifer Lopez
 Amy Madigan
 Frances McDormand
 Chloë Sevigny
 Lili Taylor
 Mare Winningham

See also
 Academy Award for Best Supporting Actress
 BAFTA Award for Best Actress in a Supporting Role
 Critics' Choice Movie Award for Best Supporting Actress
 Golden Globe Award for Best Supporting Actress – Motion Picture
 Screen Actors Guild Award for Outstanding Performance by a Female Actor in a Supporting Role

References

External links
Every BEST SUPPORTING FEMALE winner ever video on the official Film Independent YouTube channel

Female, Supp
 
Film awards for supporting actress